The Rare Occasions are an American indie rock band, formed in Boston in 2012. Current members are Brian McLaughlin (vocals, guitar), Jeremy Cohen (bass guitar, backup vocals) and Luke Imbusch (drums, backup vocals). Lead guitarist Peter Stone left in 2018. The band's debut release was the Demo Recordings EP (2012). In 2016, Futureproof was released as a fourth EP. "Notion", a song from the EP, went viral on TikTok in October 2021.

History
McLaughlin and Imbusch, who played music together during high school in Providence, Rhode Island, met Stone and Cohen at their respective colleges and decided to add them to the band, thus forming The Rare Occasions. McLaughlin came up with the name after the band went through an "identity crisis," eventually settling on "The Rare Occasions" instead of "The Custodians," which they previously went by.

Band later relocated from Boston Massachusetts to Los Angeles, California, where they recorded their second album.

Their first release was the Demo Recordings EP, released on October 12, 2012, followed by Applefork in 2013. Two studio albums were recorded, Into the Shallows (2018), and Big Whoop (2021).

Style
The Rare Occasions were described as a garage rock, indie rock, and indie pop band. The EP Futureproof introduced experimentation – string arrangements and woodwind instruments, suggested by Imbusch and vocal harmonies. 2021 album Big Whoop featured Wall of Sound guitars and electronic landscapes; McLaughlin's lyrics are philosophical and often deal with existentialism.

Members

Current members
 Brian McLaughlin – lead vocals, rhythm (2012 – present) and lead guitars, keyboards
 Jeremy Cohen – bass guitar (2012 – present), rhythm guitar, backing vocals
 Luke Imbusch – drums, harmony, backing vocals (2012 – present)

Past members
 Peter Stone – lead guitar, backing vocals (2012 – 2018)

Discography

Albums
 Into the Shallows (2018)
 Big Whoop (2021)

EPs
 Demo Recordings (2012)
 Applefork (2013)
 Feelers (2014)
 Futureproof (2016)
 Attaboy (2022)

Singles
 "An Actuary Retires" (2015)
 "Aglow" (2015)
 "Mercy Mercy" (2018)
 "You Weren't Meant to See That" (2018)
 "Physics" (2018)
 "Control" (2019)
 "Set It Right" (2020)
 "Alone" (2020)
 "Stay" (2021)
 "Call Me When You Get There" (2021)
 "Origami" (2021)
 "Notion" via Elektra Records (2021)
 "Notion (Acoustic)" (2022)
 "Notion (Cinematic)" (2022)
 "Seasick" (2022)
 "Not Afraid" (2022)

References

External links
The Rare Occasions on YouTube
 The Rare Occasions on Bandcamp

Indie rock groups
Artists from Boston
2016 songs
Indie rock musical groups from Massachusetts